Navarre Scott Momaday (born February 27, 1934) is a Kiowa novelist, short story writer, essayist, and poet. His novel House Made of Dawn was awarded the Pulitzer Prize for Fiction in 1969, and is considered the first major work of the Native American Renaissance. His follow-up work The Way to Rainy Mountain blends folklore with memoir. Momaday received the National Medal of Arts in 2007 for his work's celebration and preservation of indigenous oral and art tradition. He holds 20 honorary degrees from colleges and universities and is a fellow of the American Academy of Arts and Sciences.

Background
Navarre Scott Momaday was born on February 27, 1934, in Lawton, Oklahoma. He was delivered in the Kiowa and Comanche Indian Hospital, registered as having seven-eighths Indian blood. N. Scott Momaday's mother was Mayme 'Natachee' Scott Momaday (1913–1996), who claimed to be of partial Cherokee descent, born in Fairview, Kentucky, while his father was Alfred Morris Momaday, who was a full-blooded Kiowa. His mother was a writer and his father a painter. In 1935, when N. Scott Momaday was one year old, his family moved to Arizona, where both his father and mother became teachers on the reservation. Growing up in Arizona allowed Momaday to experience not only his father’s Kiowa traditions but also those of other southwest Native Americans including the Navajo, Apache, and Pueblo traditions. In 1946, a twelve-year-old Momaday moved to Jemez Pueblo, New Mexico, living there with his parents until his senior year of high school.   After high school, Momaday attended the University of New Mexico, graduating in 1958 with a Bachelor of Arts degree in English. He continued his education at Stanford University where, in 1963, he was awarded a Ph.D. in English Literature.

Literary career
Momaday's first book, The Complete Poems of Frederick Goddard Tuckerman based on his dissertation, was published in 1965.

His novel House Made of Dawn led to the breakthrough of Native American literature into the American mainstream after the novel was awarded the Pulitzer Prize for Fiction in 1969.

House Made of Dawn was the first novel of the Native American Renaissance, a term coined by literary critic Kenneth Lincoln in the Native American Renaissance. The work remains a classic of Native American literature.

As other indigenous American writers began to gain recognition, Momaday turned to poetry, releasing a small collection called Angle of Geese. Writing for The Southern Review, John Finlay described it as Momaday's best work, and that it should "earn him a permanent place in our literature." The poems in Angle of Geese were later included in an expanded collection, The Gourd Dancer (1976), which also included passages excised from The Way to Rainy Mountain. Most of Momaday's subsequent work has blended poetry and prose.

In 2007, Momaday returned to live in Oklahoma for the first time since his childhood. Though initially for his wife's cancer treatment, Momaday's relocation coincided with the state's centennial, and Governor Brad Henry appointed him as the sixteenth Oklahoma Poet Laureate, succeeding Nimrod International Journal editor Francine Leffler Ringold. Momaday held the position for two years.

Academic career
Momaday is tenured at Stanford University, the University of Arizona, the University of California-Berkeley, and the University of California-Santa Barbara.  Momaday has been a visiting professor at places such as Columbia and Princeton, while also being the first professor to teach American Literature in Moscow, Russia at Moscow State University.

In 1963, Momaday began teaching at the University of California-Santa Barbara as an assistant professor of English. From 1966-1967, he focused primarily on literary research, leading him to pursue the Guggenheim Fellowship at Harvard University. Two years later, in 1969, Momaday was named Professor of English at the University of California-Berkeley. Momaday taught creative writing, and produced a new curriculum based on American Indian literature and mythology.

During the 35-plus years of Momaday’s academic career, he built up a reputation specializing in American Indian oral traditions and sacred concepts of the culture itself. The many years of schooling and teaching are evidence of Momaday’s academic success, resulting in 12 honorary degrees from several American universities.

He was a Visiting Professor at the University of New Mexico during the 2014-15 academic year to teach in the Creative Writing and American Literary Studies Programs in the Department of English. Specializing in poetry and the Native oral tradition, he taught The Native American Oral Tradition.

Bibliography
The Journey of Tai-me (1967), folklore
House Made of Dawn (1968), novel
The Way to Rainy Mountain (1969) (illustrated by his father, Alfred Momaday), folklore
Angle of Geese (1974), poetry chapbook
The Gourd Dancer (1976), poetry
The Names: A Memoir (1976), memoir
The Ancient Child (1989), novel
In the Presence of the Sun (1992), stories and poetry
The Native Americans: Indian County (1993)
The Indolent Boys (Play) Premiered on the Syracuse Stage during the 1993-94 season.
Circle of Wonder: A Native American Christmas Story (1994), children's book
The Man Made of Words: Essays, Stories, Passages (1997), stories and essays
In the Bear's House (1999), mixed media
Four Arrows & Magpie: A Kiowa Story (2006), children's book
Three Plays: The Indolent Boys, Children of the Sun, and The Moon in Two Windows (2007), plays
Again the Far Morning: New and Selected Poems (2011), poetry
The Death of Sitting Bear (2020), poetry
Earth Keeper: Reflections on the American Land (2020), poetry
Dream Drawings: Configurations of a Timeless Kind (2022), poetry

Awards
In 1969, Momaday won the Pulitzer Prize for his novel "House Made of Dawn" (Pulitzer.org).

Momaday was featured in the Ken Burns and Stephen Ives documentary, The West (1996), for his masterful retelling of Kiowa history and legend. He was also featured in PBS documentaries concerning boarding schools, Billy the Kid, and the Battle of the Little Bighorn.

Momaday was honored as the Oklahoma Centennial Poet Laureate

In 1992, Momaday received the first Lifetime Achievement Award from the Native Writers' Circle of the Americas.

In 1993, Momaday received the Golden Plate Award of the American Academy of Achievement.

In 2000, Momaday received the St. Louis Literary Award from the Saint Louis University Library Associates.

Awarded a National Medal of Arts in 2007 by President George W. Bush.

Momaday received an honorary Doctor of Humane Letters from the University of Illinois at Chicago on May 9, 2010.

In 2018, Momaday won a Lifetime Achievement Award from the Anisfield-Wolf Book Awards, the only juried prize to honor the best books addressing racism and questions of equity and diversity. The same year, Momaday became one of the inductees in the first induction ceremony held by the National Native American Hall of Fame.

In 2019, Momaday was awarded the Ken Burns American Heritage Prize.

In 2019 Momaday received the Richard C. Holbrooke Distinguished Achievement Award of the Dayton Literary Peace Prize.

Recent activities
Momaday is the founder of the Rainy Mountain Foundation and Buffalo Trust, a nonprofit organization working to preserve Native American cultures. Momaday, a known watercolor painter, designed and illustrated the book, In the Bear's House.

See also

Poets Laureate of Oklahoma
List of writers from peoples indigenous to the Americas
Native American Renaissance
Native American Studies

Notes

External links

 
 N. Scott Momaday: Words from a Bear, 2019 PBS documentary
 Western American Literature Journal: N. Scott Momaday
 N. Scott Momaday from the Modern American Poetry site
 The Buffalo Trust - Momaday's non-profit charitable foundation
 Perspectives in American Literature - Momaday Bibliography
 Interview with Momaday at modernamericanpoetry.org
  Article about Momaday's selection as Poet Laureate of Oklahoma
 "N. Scott Momaday" by Martha Scott Trimble in the Western Writers Series Digital Editions
 Voices of Oklahoma interview with N. Scott Momaday. First person interview conducted on December 21, 2010, with N. Scott Momaday. 
Native paths: American Indian art from the collection of Charles and Valerie Diker, an exhibition catalog from The Metropolitan Museum of Art (fully available online as PDF), which contains an essay by N. Scott Momaday (see table of contents)
N. Scott Momaday Papers .Yale Collection of American Literature, Beinecke Rare Book and Manuscript Library.

1934 births
Living people
20th-century American novelists
21st-century American novelists
American male novelists
American people of Cherokee descent
Kiowa people
Native American novelists
People from Lawton, Oklahoma
Postmodern writers
Pulitzer Prize for Fiction winners
United States National Medal of Arts recipients
Native American essayists
University of California, Santa Barbara faculty
Male essayists
20th-century essayists
21st-century essayists
Poets Laureate of Oklahoma
20th-century American male writers
21st-century American male writers
Novelists from Oklahoma
People from Jemez Springs, New Mexico
20th-century American non-fiction writers
21st-century American non-fiction writers
American male non-fiction writers